Raven Creek is a tributary of Fishing Creek in Columbia County, Pennsylvania, in the United States. Numerous bridges, both covered and non-covered, have been built over the creek. Its main tributary is East Branch Raven Creek.

Course
Raven Creek begins in southern Sugarloaf Township near the community of Five Points on Saint Gabriel Hill. It flows south-southwest, reaching Benton Township within a mile. In Benton Township, the creek flows into a valley between Saint Gabriel Hill and Long Hill. Further downstream, it turns south for a few miles, crossing Pennsylvania Route 239. In the southern part of the township, it receives the tributary East Branch Raven Creek and turns southwest, exiting Benton Township. Upon exiting Benton Township, the creek enters Fishing Creek Township and shortly afterwards Stillwater. In Stillwater, Raven Creek enters the valley of Fishing Creek and turns southeast, flowing parallel to the latter creek. Slightly more than a mile downstream, it reaches its confluence with Fishing Creek.

Tributaries
East Branch Raven Creek is the main tributary of Raven Creek.

Geography and geology, and watershed

Two covered bridges historically crossed Raven Creek: the Joe Ash Covered Bridge and the McHenry's Mill or Paperdale Covered Bridge. The former was destroyed in 1963 or 1964 and the latter was destroyed in 1958.

Additionally, a number of other bridges have been built across Raven Creek. A concrete tee beam bridge was built across the creek in 1928. Another bridge was built across it in 1950 and three more were built between 1958 and 1963. A prestressed box beam bridge was built in 1968. A steel culvert bridge and a concrete culvert bridge were built across the creek in 1974 and 1976, respectively and another bridge was built in 2011.

Raven Creek is described as "quite a stream" in John Gosse Freeze's 1888 book A History of Columbia County, Pennsylvania: From the Earliest Times.

History and etymology
Raven Creek may have been historically known as Raving Creek due to the way it appeared during floods. The name later became Ravin' Creek before becoming Raven Creek.

On July 30, 1864, a group of several army veterans (including a Lieutenant Robinson) and two civilians named Isiah Harrison and Eli Buckalew rode on horseback from Fairmount Springs, in Luzerne County, into Columbia County to search for deserters. During this search, the searchers, who were later dubbed the "Lincoln Midnight Riders", rode parallel to Raven Creek for some time. Lieutenant Robinson was shot later in the search, triggering claims of an alleged military uprising called the Fishing Creek Confederacy.

A member of the Patterson family constructed a gristmill at the mouth of Raven Creek in Stillwater in 1865. After some time, it was converted into a paper mill and used to manufacture wrapping paper. The Impervious Paper Company of Scranton  owned the mill from 1910 to 1912 and used it to make cartridge paper.

Biology
East Branch Raven Creek, a tributary of Raven Creek, has brook trout reproducing in it.

See also
Bee Sellers Hollow, next tributary of Fishing Creek going downstream
Davis Hollow, next tributary of Fishing Creek going upstream
List of tributaries of Fishing Creek (North Branch Susquehanna River)
List of rivers of Pennsylvania

References

Rivers of Columbia County, Pennsylvania
Tributaries of Fishing Creek (North Branch Susquehanna River)
Rivers of Pennsylvania